Chloroclystis inops is a moth in the  family Geometridae. It is found on Kay Island.

References

Moths described in 1898
Chloroclystis